Jay Noren, M.D., is the former President of Wayne State University and former Provost of Khalifa University in Abu Dhabi.

Life

On Tuesday, July 20, 2010, Jay Noren announced his resignation from Wayne State University for personal reasons.

In December 2015, Noren applied for the presidency of the University of North Dakota. He was one of six finalist applicants invited to the University in early 2016, though the position was ultimately given to Mark Kennedy.

References

External links
 Official university web page
 Wayne State University appoints Dr. Jay Noren as the university's 10th President, Press release from the Wayne State University.
 New second in command is ISU's highest-ranked woman ever.

Presidents of Wayne State University
American public health doctors
Living people
University of Minnesota Medical School alumni
Harvard School of Public Health alumni
Wayne State University faculty
University of Nebraska Medical Center faculty
Year of birth missing (living people)